Evalyn Bostock, sometimes spelled Evelyn Bostock, (8 March 1917 - 28 November 1944) was an actress who died young from poisoning. She had lead roles including in the 1935 film The Cowboy Millionaire 

She was born in London. She died in Los Angeles.

Filmography
Thark (1932) as Kitty Stratton
Perfect Understanding (1933) as Maid
The Moonstone (1934) as Roseanna Spearman
The Cowboy Millionaire (1935) as	Pamela Barclay

References

External links
Findagrave entry

Actors from London

1917 births
1944 deaths